The Shakori Hills GrassRoots Festival of Music and Dance is a biannual music and dance festival held the first Thursday thru Sunday in May and October in Pittsboro. The festival takes place on a  farmstead which is managed by Shakori Hills Community Arts Center Inc. (SHCAC), a nonprofit organization. The festival supports the music and art programs of the SHCAC. It is associated with and modeled after the larger Finger Lakes Grassroots Festival that takes place near Trumansburg, New York each summer. The spring festival started in April 2003 and the fall festival was launched in 2004.

The Festival
The festival typically lasts four days, beginning on Thursday afternoon and going through Sunday night. The farmstead has two large outdoor stages, one large covered dance tent, the Front Porch Stage for music workshops, a Cabaret Tent, and The Outpost which is specifically programmed with teenagers in mind. 4-Day and single day passes are available. Primitive, vehicle, and RV camping is available for an additional fee.

In addition to the music, the festival has music and dance workshops, a sustainability fair, kids activities, and food and craft vending with local food trucks and artisans. The family-friendly festival is free for children 12 and under and offers a special youth rate for 13–15-year-olds. 

Attendance is stronger on Saturday, Friday, and Sunday with Thursday being known as a "locals" night. The spring festival is usually double the size of the fall festival.

Music
Each festival draws fifty or more bands who play on four stages over four days. Many genres of music are represented, including bluegrass, zydeco, country-western, psychedelic rock, folk rock, reggae, and world music. Past headliners include Del McCoury Band, Lukas Nelson & Promise of the Real, The Wood Brothers, Bela Fleck and the Flecktones, Galactic, Billy Strings, Nahko Bear, Robert Randolph, Yonder Mountain String Band, Donna the Buffalo, Nickel Creek, Keith Frank, Patty Loveless, Toubab Krewe, Steve Earle and the Dukes, and Rising Appalachia. 

Band and instrument (mandolin, guitar, fiddle) contests are held with the best band winning a slot on a Sunday stage. 

Music starts around 11:00 a.m. and goes late into the evening. Saturday evening is capped by a popular drum circle.

See also

List of jam band music festivals

References

External links
Official Shakori Hills GrassRoots Festival of Music and Dance homepage

Dance festivals in the United States
Dance in North Carolina
Music festivals in North Carolina
Jam band festivals